Mesosa quadriplagiata is a species of beetle in the family Cerambycidae. It was described by Stephan von Breuning in 1935. It is known from Laos, Vietnam and China.

References

quadriplagiata
Beetles described in 1935